Louis Cass (November 16, 1889 – August 7, 1971) was an American rugby union player who played at scrum-half for the United States men's national team in its first capped match against New Zealand in 1913.

Biography
Cass was born on November 16, 1889 in Los Angeles, California, the son and third of eight children of Alonzo Beecher Cass and Emily Flora Cass (born Tufts). In 1907, Cass' mother died. Cass attended Los Angeles High School, and was quarterback of school's football team that won the California state championship in 1908.

Cass began attending Stanford University in 1910 and was a member of the university's rugby teams. Cass did not play with the varsity team in 1910 or 1911 due to injury, but served as captain for the Stanford team during the 1912 and 1913 seasons (his junior and senior years, respectively). In 1912, he was a member of the United States team that played against Australia in its first test match on November 16, but he did not make an appearance in that game. On November 15, 1913, Cass played for the United States at scrum-half in its first test match against New Zealand—a 51–3 defeat. In 1915, alongside fellow Stanford and United States rugby player Mow Mitchell, Cass was a member of a Southern California All-Star rugby team that played a series of matches against university and Northern California All-Star opposition in October and November of that year.

After attending Stanford, Cass founded an insurance company called Cass & Johansing. He married a woman named Virginia Nourse. Cass died on August 7, 1971 in Los Angeles at the age of 81.

External links

References

1889 births
1971 deaths
American rugby union players
United States international rugby union players
Rugby union scrum-halves